The 1990 European Weightlifting Championships were held in Ålborg, Denmark from May 14 to May 20, 1990. It was the 69th edition of the event. There were a total number of 126 athletes competing, from 23 nations. The women competition were held in Santa Cruz de Tenerife, Spain. It was the 3rd event for the women.

Medal summary

Men

Women

Medal table
Ranking by Big (Total result) medals

External links
Men's results
Women's results

European Weightlifting Championships
European Weightlifting Championships
European Weightlifting Championships
International sports competitions hosted by Denmark
Sport in Aalborg
Weightlifting in Denmark